Vitebsk Television Tower, also known as Viciebsk, Vitsebsk or Vitsyebsk TV Tower, is a  tall steel Belarusian lattice television tower that is located in the city of Vitebsk, in Belarus, thus the name. Having been built in 1983 as a unique, multi-purpose television tower, the Vitebsk TV Tower is utilized for transmitting FM-/TV-broadcasting throughout the city.

Having a unique design, the tower is a free-standing lattice structure built with a horizontal cross on which the antenna mast is anchored.

History 

The Vitebsk Television Tower's construction started and concluded at the same year in 1983. Just like its taller resemblance, the tower's completion benefited numerous citizens in the whole of the area as the television tower transmits FM-/TV-broadcasting throughout the city of Vitebsk up until today. To sum up, the tower has served its very purpose for a total of 29 years.

Geography 

The Vitebsk Television Tower is situated in the city of Vitebsk, which in turn serves as the capital of the Vitebsk Region and is the fourth-largest city of the whole of Belarus. Its taller resemblance, the Grodno TV Tower, lies in the city of Grodno, thus the name.

Vitebsk 

Currently the capital of the Vitebsk Oblast, the city had 342,381 inhabitants in 2004, making it the country's fourth-largest city. Its airways are secured and served by the Vitebsk Vostochny Airport and Vitebsk air base.

See also 
Lattice tower
Grodno TV Tower
Vitebsk
Vitebsk Region

References

External links 
Vitebsk City - Belarus, Vitebsk Travel :: SphereInfo.com
Travel Vitebsk  TravelManana
Viciebsk TV tower from the ruinous building at Jurjeva Hill in Viciebsk

Lattice towers
Towers completed in 1983
Buildings and structures in Vitebsk
Radio masts and towers in Europe
Towers in Belarus